Leonard W. Roberts (January 28, 1912 - April 29, 1983) was an early folklorist, professor, and publisher.

Roberts was born in Floyd County, Kentucky to Lewis Jackson and Rhoda Jane (Osborn) Roberts.  He graduated from Berea College before studying creative writing at the University of Iowa.  Roberts then attended the University of Kentucky, where he earned a PhD in English.

While at the University of Kentucky, he began collecting folktales from his students and their families.  Roberts later studied folklore at Indiana University before accepting a position as professor at Pikeville College.  While at Pikeville College, he founded a press which published the literary journal Twigs (which later became Cumberlands), as well as numerous books of poetry and regional history.  In his career, Roberts also taught at the Berea Foundation School, Morehead State University, Union College (Kentucky), and West Virginia Wesleyan College.

Roberts was killed in a traffic accident and is buried in Ivel, Kentucky.

Publications
 I Bought Me a Dog and Other Folktales from the Southern Mountains (Berea, KY:  Council of the Southern Mountains), 1954. [reprinted in 1959 and 1972]
 South from Hell-fer-Sartin (Lexington, KY:  University of Kentucky Press), 1955. [reprinted in 1987, ]
 Nippy and the Yankee Doodle and More Folk Tales from the Southern Mountains (Berea, KY:  Council of the Southern Mountains), 1958. [reprinted in 1963]
 Up Cutshin and Down Greasy: Folkways of a Kentucky Family (Lexington, KY:  University of Kentucky Press), 1959. [reprinted in 1988, ]
 Old Greasybeard: Tales from the Cumberland Gap (Pikeville, KY: Pikeville College Press), 1969. [reprinted in 1980]
 The McCoys: Their Story (Pikeville, KY:  Preservation Council Press), 1976. 
 In the Pine: Selected Kentucky Folksongs (Pikeville, KY:  Pikeville College Press), 1978.
 The Couches Tales and Songs reprinted later as Sang Branch Settlers (Pikeville, KY:  Pikeville College Press), 1980.

References
 "Leonard W. Roberts" in The Kentucky Encyclopedia (Lexington, KY:  The University Press of Kentucky), 1992.  
 Jones, Loyal. 2017. My Curious and Jocular Heroes: Tales and Tale-Spinners from Appalachia.  Urbana: University of Illinois Press. 

1912 births
People from Floyd County, Kentucky
Berea College alumni
University of Kentucky alumni
American folklorists
1983 deaths
University of Pikeville faculty